Belle Fountain is an unincorporated community located in the town of Marcellon, Columbia County, Wisconsin, United States. Local history holds that the community was named for a nearby body of water.

Notes

Unincorporated communities in Columbia County, Wisconsin
Unincorporated communities in Wisconsin